Miminiska Water Aerodrome  is an aerodrome located on Lake Miminiska, Ontario, Canada.

See also
Miminiska Airport

References

Registered aerodromes in Kenora District
Seaplane bases in Ontario